The Panüeler Kopf (also called Panüler Kopf, Panüeler Kopf, short Panüeler or Panüler) is a mountain in the Austrian state Vorarlberg. The Panüeler Kopf is part of the Schesaplana group and with an elevation of  the second highest mountain in the Rätikon mountain range. The 950 m high west face is the highest rock face in the Rätikon.

Ascents 
Ascents from alpine club huts:
 From Mannheimer Hütte in maximum one hour.
 From Oberzalimhütte via the hiking path Straußsteig in three to four hours. The Straußsteig follows the north ridge of the Panüeler Kopf.

Climbing:
  Difficulty is UIAA grade III. First ascensionists of this route were R. Jenny and F. Schatzmann in 1923.

References 

Two-thousanders of Austria
Mountains of the Alps
Mountains of Vorarlberg